African heavy metal refers to the heavy metal music scene in Africa, particularly in East African countries such as Kenya and Uganda, and Southern African countries including Namibia, Madagascar, Angola, Botswana, South Africa, Mozambique, and Zimbabwe. It also extends into North African nations such as Algeria, Egypt, Libya, Morocco, and Tunisia, although bands in the North African region associate themselves more closely with the MENA region in terms of cultural and social consistencies. African heavy metal is characterized by the use of European and American metal genres, usually blended with traditional African instruments and musical styles, creating distinct regional differences.

History

Southern Africa 
Author Edward Banchs traveled extensively through the African countries with the most prominent metal scenes and published a book covering the musicians and the rise and struggles of the respective scenes in the Sub-Saharan and island countries. According to Banchs, South Africa has developed an intensely robust metal scene due to the existing music industry and the large population that could support the growing metal scene. In South Africa, heavy metal was introduced in the mid-1980s to the mid-1990s in Johannesburg and was met with support with the relative success of bands such as Odyssey, Ragnärok, Urban Assault, and Voice of Destruction. The arrival of metal music in the country was controversial. For example, the government and the N.G Kerk banned certain records from being imported, and fans of the genre faced hostility from the public with accusations of satanism. With the rise of the dance music around the turn of the century, the genre experienced a relative decline until its resurgence in the mid-2000s. In 2010, some South African music groups such as Red Helen, Facing The Gallows and Betray The Emissary followed a more international standard and approach to music. In South Africa, the fan base and band members are predominantly made up of white South Africans unlike in other African countries, such as Botswana, where the fan base is predominately from the black majority. The first black metal band in South Africa with all black members, Demogorath Satanum, was formed in 2009 and works to change the perception of metal music as a genre for white people and bring more black fans into the South African metal scene.

The Botswana heavy metal scene started in the 1970s with the introduction of classic rock and evolved into a distinctive sub-culture with a cowboy inspired aesthetic. Wrust, Overthrust, and Skinflint have achieved some international success and recognition. The 2014 documentary March of the Gods: Botswana Metalheads documents the heavy metal scene in Botswana.

Other Southern African countries such as Mozambique, Namibia, Zimbabwe, and Madagascar are developing metal scenes as well. The Mozambique metal scene is the subject of the documentary, Terra Pesada. Namibia held a metal festival in Windhoek intermittently between 2007 and 2014 called the Windhoek Metal Fest. Zimbabwe held its first documented metal concert in Harare in 2015 and the first album recorded in Shona was released in 2018. Madagascar also has a developing metal scene recorded by Edward Banchs. The Angola metal scene was documented and featured in the film Death Metal Angola.

North Africa 
Metal made an appearance in North Africa in the 1980s. North African heavy metal bands in particular are aligned with the political side of metal, and members of metal bands are often activists. The metal scenes in North Africa are marked by political and social repression. In January 1997, between 78 and 87 metal fans were forcibly removed from their homes and imprisoned under Egypt's statute against the "contempt of heavenly religions" and for obscene acts, drug possession, and promoting extreme ideas. The media took hold of the information about the arrests and spread stories of drug abuse, Satanic rituals, animal sacrifice, and orgies. Defendants were eventually released due to a lack of evidence, but some were held for as long as three weeks. The metal scene retreated following the crackdown in 1997 but came back slowly and cautiously to avoid suspicion in the 2000s and has now largely recovered from the 1997 arrests. The 2011 revolution in Egypt politicized metal further and caused the genre to gain popularity in mainstream audiences. However, heavy metal is still not fully accepted by society in Egypt. Security forces have prevented 35 metal bands from entering the country, and, in 2012, the media and the Muslim Brotherhood accused fans of the genre of Satanism, although the allegations did not produce the same effects as those made in 1997. Many bands have since left Egypt, however, finding that the end of the revolution has caused the scene to wane.

The metal scene in Morocco faced a similar series of arrests as Egypt. Nine heavy metal band members and five fans were sentenced to serve prison time for being anti-Islamic in 2003. The 14 individuals were released after Moroccans protested. Despite the scrutiny metal fans face in Morocco, festivals like L'Boulevard which host hip hop and metal musicians from around the world have gained popularity and government support in recent years, and an organization called the Moroccan Metal Community organizes metal concerts and promotes Moroccan metal bands.

Tunisia, Libya, and Algeria have smaller metal scenes than their North African counterparts. Tunisian bands note that the scene is struggling due to a lack of access to equipment, record labels, venues, and recording studios. Musicians also cite the revolution in 2011 as a reason for the lack of development of the heavy metal scene. Libya's art scene is also where a heavy metal scene is developing after the Libyan Civil War (2011). Algeria's metal scene is strong, beginning in the 1990s as an underground movement during the Algerian Civil War and has sustained attacks by the media and the public.

East, Central, and West Africa 
Eastern and Western Africa have seen less of a presence. Kenya and Uganda in Eastern Africa have metal scenes. Kenya first was introduced to metal music in the 1990s and grew in popularity in the 2000s. Kenyan musicians use their Christian beliefs and the post-election crisis of 2008 as inspiration for their songs. Central Africa and Western Africa do not have a documented history of metal music.

Researchers attribute the lack of metal scenes in African countries to multiple factors. First, music scenes require a degree of urbanization. African metal scenes are often centered in capital cities, and music scenes require regular access to power for musicians to be able to produce and play music. Researchers also attribute the lack of metal scenes to a lack of Internet access, which is required for the influx and spread of Western music in African countries, and the lack of a music infrastructure in African countries in general including venues and record labels. Despite these barriers, metal has spread considerably across the continent in recent decades, and nascent scenes that are not documented formally are possible. The availability of music online and tutorship from world class musicians whose instructional videos are freely available has had an impact on how musicians in the heavy metal genre improve themselves and include new and trending sounds such as djent or black metal.

As early as 1983, in the Island of Madagascar. A band named Kadradraka 2000 was formed and started playing heavy metal. Followed by bands like Martu Gass, Kazar, Lokomotiva, Vy Mafonja, Men out ( around 1986). Pharaons, Hemirah, Destruktor (1988-1989) were mostly Tharsh and Black Metal. Pharaons is possibly the first African extreme metal issued an LP album "Evil World" in 1989.

References

20th-century music genres
Rock music genres
African popular music
Botswana music
Heavy metal by location